753 Tiflis is a minor planet orbiting the Sun. It was discovered 30 April 1913 by the Georgian–Russian astronomer Grigory N. Neujmin at Simeiz Observatory and was named after Georgia's capital city Tiflis (now called Tbilisi). The orbital plane is inclined by an angle of 10.1° to the plane of the ecliptic. In 1991, Ruth F. Wolfe included it as a member of the proposed Tiflis asteroid family.

This is classed as an S-type asteroid in the Tholen taxonomy. It spans a girth of approximately 23.6 km and rotates on its axis every 9.85 hours.

References

External links 
 Discovery Circumstances: Numbered Minor Planets
 
 

Background asteroids
Tiflis
Tiflis
S-type asteroids (Tholen)
L-type asteroids (SMASS)
19130430